This is a list of compositions by the Bohemian composer Jan Kalivoda.

Orchestra

Overtures
 Overture No. 1 in D minor op. 38 (published by 1832) 
 Overture No. 2 in F op. 44 (published by 1830) 
 Overture No. 3 in C op. 55 (published by 1835) 
 Festival Overture (No. 4) in E major op. 56 (published by 1835) 
 Overture No. 5 in D op. 76 (pub. 1837)
 Overture No. 6 in E op. 85 (first published 1839?) ("composée et dédiée à monsieur L. Spohr") 
 Overture No. 7 in C minor op. 101, dedicated "a la Société du Concert d'Euterpe a Leipzig"  (pub. 1840)
 Overture No. 8 "Ouverture pastorale", in A major op. 108 
 Overture No. 9 "Ouverture solennelle", op. 126 (published by 1845) 
 Overture No. 10 in F minor op. 142 (by 1845) 
 Overture No. 11 op. 143 in B (B?) (pub.1847)
 Overture No. 12 in D major op. 145 (Composed by 1843 for Prince Egon II of Fürstenberg's Silver Wedding Anniversary, and dedicated to the members of the court orchestra. Published Leipzig: Peters, by 1849) 
 Fürstenberg Anthem op. 145a (incorporated into No. 12.)
 Overture No. 14 in C minor op. 206 (published 1855) 
 Overture No. 15 op. 226 "Prague Festival" 
 Overture No. 16 in A minor op. 238
 Overture No. 17 op. 242 (around 1860)

Symphonies
 Symphony No. 1 in F minor op. 7 (premiered 1824)
 Symphony No. 2 in E major, op. 17 (1829) 
 Symphony No. 3 in D minor op. 32 (premiered March 10, 1830 in Donaueschingen; published around 1831)  (score reviewed April 4, 1832 in the Allgemeine musikalische Zeitung, pp. 221–224)
 Symphony No. 4 in C op. 60 (1836) 
 Symphony No. 5 in B minor op. 106 (pub. 1840)
 Symphony No. 6 in F major op. 132 (published 1845) 
 Symphony No. 7 in G minor (WoO)

Concertante
 Polonaise for violin with piano or orchestral accompaniment, no. 1, op. 8 (published in Bronsvic by Spehr about 1828). Exists also in version for string quartet.) 
 Violin concerto No. 1 in E op. 9 (published by Breitkopf und Härtel about 1828) 
 Variations brillantes für 2 Violinen und Orchester op. 14 (published 1829) 
 Concertino for violin with piano or orchestral accompaniment, op. 15 (published 1829)
 Grand rondeau: pour le piano avec accompagnement de l'orchestre, op. 16 
 Concertante for two violins with orchestra or piano, op. 20 (published 1830)
 Second concertino for violin (with piano or orchestra) in A op. 30 (around 1830) 
 Second Potpourri for violin and piano or orchestra in D op. 36 (published around 1833) 
 Grand rondeau: pour le violon avec accompagnement d'orchestre ou de pianoforte, op. 37 (published 1833) 
 Second Polonaise for Violin with Orchestral accompaniment op. 45 
 Introduction and rondo for horn and orchestra op. 51 (premiered in Donaueschingen on November 27, 1833; published around 1834)  
 Divertimento for flute with piano or orchestra accompaniment op. 52 (about 1833) 
 Variations and rondo for bassoon and orchestra. op. 57 (modern edition published 1976) 
 Divertimento for oboe and orchestra op. 58 (published by 1835) 
 Divertimento for two horns and orchestra op. 59 (republished by Edition Kunzelmann in 1981)
 Introduction, variations et rondeau pour le piano-forte avec accompagnement d’orchestre op. 71 
 Third concertino for violin (or concerto) in D (with piano or orchestra) op. 72 (published 1836) 
 Variations brillantes sur un thème original pour le violon avec accompagnement d'orchestre ou de pianoforte, op. 73 (about 1835) 
 Introduction et rondeau facile pour le piano-forte avec accompagnement de 2 violons, viola et violoncelle (or orchestra), op. 82 
 Variations concertantes (or Concerto) (for two violins with orchestral or piano accompaniment) op. 83, published around 1840 
 Fourth concertino for violin (with piano or orchestra) in C op. 100 (pub. 1840)
 Introduction and rondo for two violins accompanied by piano or orchestra, op. 109 (published about 1843) 
 Concertino for Oboe and Orchestra op. 110 (modern edition published 1974) 
 Fantasie for Violin with Orchestra or Piano in E op. 125 
 Introduction and variations for clarinet and orchestra op. 128 (1844 arrangement of a four-hand piano composition. Premiered in Leipzig on February 8, 1844.)
 Fifth concertino for violin and orchestra or piano in A op. 133 (published 1844)  
 Third Divertissement for Violin and Orchestra op. 134 
 Sixth concertino for violin and orchestra or piano op. 151 in D (pub. 1848)
 Concertino for flute, oboe and orchestra in F major

String Quartet
 String quartet no. 1 in E minor op. 61 (pub. 1835) 
 String quartet no. 2 in A major op. 62 (pub. 1836) (published by Amadeus-Verlag in Winterthur, Switzerland in 1999)
 String quartet no. 3 in G major op. 90 (Moderato - Scherzo (Vivace in G minor) - Adagio (E♭ major) - Allegretto grazioso (G major)) (published by Peters in 1830)

Chamber music
 Variations brillantes for violin op. 22 
 Two duos for two violins op. 70  
 Six new études or caprices for violin op. 87.
 Variations brillantes for violin and piano quintet op. 89.
 Introduction, romance et rondeau pour le violon op. 107 
 Introduction et variations brillantes sun un thème original pour le violon, op. 118 
 First grand trio concertante in F minor for piano forte, violin & violoncello, op. 121 (composed 1842; pub. Dresden: G.Paul, 1844) 
 Variations de concert for piano quartet op. 129 (published around 1844) 
 Second grand trio in B♭, op. 130 (composed 1844; published Leipzig: C.F. Peters, 1845 - publication date not in score but obtained from New Grove)  
 Three duos for two violins op. 152 
 Drei Duos für Zwei Violen op. 178 (Edition Peters Nr. 9082)
 Three Duos for two violins op. 179 
 Six Nocturnes for Viola and Piano op. 186 (1851, published 1882); republished by Kalmus in 2003
 Third grand trio in E♭ major, op. 200 (composed 1855) 
 Fantasy in F major for viola and piano op. 204 (1855)
 Duets for violin and viola op. 208 (1955) 
 Morceaux de Salon for Oboe and Piano op. 228 (modern edition published 2001) 
 Morceau de Salon for Clarinet and Piano op. 229 (modern edition published Winterthur: Amadeus-Verlag in 2002.) 
 Morceau de Salon for Bassoon and Piano op. 230 
 Two songs for harmonium and piano op. 250 
 Serenade for flute, oboe, horn, bassoon and guitar

Piano
 Polonaise for piano (two or four hands) (same work?) also op. 8 (published about 1830 by Bronsvic : Meyer) 
 Rondo for piano op. 11 in A (published 1829)
 Trois Grandes Marches pour le Piano à quatre mains op. 26 
 Divertissement in F major pour le Piano à quatre mains op. 28 
 Fantaisie for Piano op.33 in E (pub. 1832)
 Grande Sonate in G minor pour le Piano à quatre mains op. 135 (pub. 1845) (recorded )
 Piano Sonata in E♭ major op. 176

Vocal
 Six songs for alto or bass with piano accompaniment op. 79 
 Six songs for various voice ranges with piano accompaniment op. 99 (published by Peters around 1865) 
 Heimathlied (Homesong) for soprano, clarinet and piano, op. 117 
 Three Songs for Alto or Baritone op. 182

Choral
 Mass in A major op. 137 (four solo voices, chorus, and orchestra) (published in 1846) 
 Four "Deutsche Chöre" for Men's Voices op. 233 
 Mass in A minor (unaccompanied SATB chorus, not op. 137 which is in A major, and with orchestra) (published by Carus-Verlag in Stuttgart in 1999)
 Mass in G major (WoO VI/5) "per coro SAM" (ed. László Strauß-Németh) published by Stuttgart: Carus-Verlag in 2003.
 Mass in F major (WoO VI/3) (coro SATB) (ed. László Strauß-Németh)  (published by Stuttgart: Carus-Verlag in 2006.)

Opera & Stage
 ”Die Audienz” (Allegorical (Festive) Drama)
 ”Prinzessin Christine” (Opera in 3 Acts)
 ”Billibambuffs Hochzeitsreise zum Orcus und Olymp” (Fastnachtsspiel, a manner of Burlesque popular in the 15th century)
 ”Blanda, die silberne Birke” (Opera in 3 Acts)

Other
 Grande fantaisie sur des motifs de l’opéra Fra Diavo(e)lo , op. 41

References

Kalivoda
Kalivoda